Muthappan is a deity commonly worshiped in the Kannur, Kasargod, Kozhikode, Malapuram region of Kerala and Coorg region of Karnataka in India. Muthappan is considered as the personification of two Hindu gods — the Thiruvappan or Valiya Muttapan (Vishnu) and the Vellatom or Cheriya Muttapan (Shiva).

The shrine where Muthappan is worshipped is called Madappura.The Parassinikadavu Madappura is the most important.

Practices in Muthappan temples are quite distinct from those in other Hindu temples of Kerala.The rituals are related to Shakteyam where Panja-ma-kara are offered, sometimes including madyam (in this case,Toddy) and mamsam (generally flesh, in this case - fish). The main liturgy is a ritual enactment of Muthappan, performed daily at the Parassinikadavu temple. Most temples in Kerala do not allow non-Hindus to enter; Muthappan temples are said to be much more liberal in this regard.
 
Muthappan is the principal deity in the ritualistic Theyyam dance (Muthappan Theyyam) performed in the Parassinikkadavu temple. The ritual performers of Muthappan Theyyam belong to the Vannan community of Kerala. The puja rituals and rites for Muthappan are performed by the Thiyyar community

Myths and legends

Muthappan is believed to be the personification of two divine figures — Thiruvappana and Vellatom. The dual divine figures Thiruvappana and Vellatom are similar to those of the Theyyamkaliyattem of the northern Malabar region. Though Sree Muthappan is worshiped as a single deity, it actually represents an integrated or unified form of two gods: Vishnu (with a fish-shaped crown) and Shiva (with a crescent-shaped crown).

Sri Muthappan's Theyyams are performed year-round whereas other Theyyams are seasonal (lasting October to May).

Muthappan stories

Parassinikkadavu Muthappan
The traditional story of Parassinikkadavu Muthappan describes the background of the deity.

Ayyankara Illam വാഴുന്നവർ (Mannanar dynasty), was unhappy, as he had no child. His wife, Padikutty Amma, was a devotee of Lord Shiva. She made a sacrifice to Shiva for children. One day in her dream she saw the Lord. The very next day, while she was returning after a bath from a nearby river, she saw a pretty child lying on a rock nearby. (There is, even today, a rock, believed to be this one, still visited and venerated.) She took the child home and she and her husband brought Him up as their own son.

The boy used to visit the jungle near their house (mana) for hunting with His bow and arrows. He would then take food to the poor and mingle with local communities. As these acts were against the way of life, His parents earnestly requested Him to stop this practice, but the boy turned a deaf ear to their warnings. Ayyankara Vazhunavar became very disappointed.

Ayyankara Vazhunavar decided to take the matters into his hands and admonished him. The boy revealed His divine form (Visvaroopam, or Viswaroopa, or Cosmic All-Pervading Form) to His parents. They then realized that the boy was not an ordinary child, but God. They prostrated themselves in front of Him, surrendering themselves to him. The moment he got out of his house, everything that came under Muthappan's vision burned and turned into ashes due to his sadness in leaving the house. His mother told him that he should not walk all the way destroying every creation in this world. Muthappan pierced his eyes so that nothing shall be disintegrated with his vision. Thiruvappana is depicted as blind because of this.

He then started a journey from Ancharamanaykkal. The natural beauty of Kunnathoor detained Him. He was also attracted by the toddy of palm trees.

Chandan (an illiterate toddy tapper) knew that his toddy was being stolen from his palm trees, so he decided to guard them. While he was keeping guard at night, he caught an old man stealing toddy from his palms. He got very angry and tried to shoot the man using his bow and arrows but fell unconscious before he could let loose even one arrow. Chandan's wife came searching for him. She cried brokenheartedly when she found him unconscious at the base of the tree. She saw an old man at the top of the palm tree and called out to Him, saying "Muthappan" ( means 'grandfather' in the local Malayalam language). She earnestly prayed to the God to save her husband. Before long, Chandan regained consciousness. She offered boiled gram (chickpea), slices of coconut, burnt fish and toddy to the Muthappan. (Even today, in Sree Muthappan temples, the devotees are offered boiled grams and slices of coconut.)  She sought a blessing from Him. Muthappan chose Kunnathoor as His residence at the request of Chandan. This is the famous Kunnathoor Padi.

After spending some years at Kunnathoor, Sree Muthappan decided to look for a more favorable residence so that He could achieve His objective of His Avataram. He shot an arrow upward from Kunnathoor. The shaft reached Parassini where the Parassini Temple stands today. The arrow, when it was found, was glowing in the Theertha (sacred water) near the temple. The arrow was placed on the altar. Since then, Lord Sree Muthappan has been believed to reside at Parassinikkadavu.

When Thiruvappan-Muthappan traveled through the jungle, he reached Puralimala near Peravoor. Here he met another muthappan; Thiruvappan called him , meaning 'young boy', in Malayalam, and accompanied him. This second Muthappan is called Vellattam (or ). The Theyyam for this utilises a round-shaped throne made of hay.

Sree Muthappan and dogs
Sree Muthappan is always accompanied by a dog. Dogs are considered sacred here and one can see dogs in large numbers in and around the temple.

There are two carved bronze dogs at the entrance of the temple that are believed to symbolize the bodyguards of the God. When the Prasad is ready, it is first served to a dog that is always ready inside the temple complex.

Local legends enhance the importance of dogs to Sree Muthappan, such as the story that follows:

 A few years ago, temple authorities decided to reduce the number of dogs inside the temple; so they took some dogs and puppies away. From that very day, the performer of the Sree Muthappan Theyyam was unable to perform; it is said that the spirit of Sree Muthappan enters the performer's body for the duration of the ceremony. But he probably refused to enter the Theyyam performer's body because the dogs had been removed. Realizing their mistake, the dogs were brought back to the temple by the temple authorities. From that day onwards, Theyyam performances returned to normal.

Festival procession
Tradition requires that the annual Ulsavam festival of the Muthappan Temple at Parassinikkadavu start by a procession led by a male member of the Thayyil clan of Thayyil from Thiyya community, Kannur from the family home to the main altar of the temple, where he offers a 'Pooja' (prayer) to the God.

Local traditions in Kannur and Kasaragod

Several Muthappan temples are seen in Kannur and Kasaragod districts in Kerala and Coorg district in Karnataka and several temples are built by the migrated devotees in Coimbatore Bangalore, Mumbai, Ahemadabad, Delhi, Chennai, and also in Gulf countries. This signifies the popularity of the god in the minds of the people of North Malabar of Kerala and Coorg. Each Madappura has its own tradition.

One interesting story relating to God Muthappan is about the Nileshwar Muthappan Madappura. The Sree Muthappan temple near National Highway No 17 in Nileshwar has a rich heritage. It conveys the philosophical, devotional and educational importance of Nileshwar. There is an interesting story regarding the construction of this Sree Muthappan Temple. An elder member of the Koroth family regularly visited the place now known as the Muthappan temple and drank madhu (toddy), the liquor fermented from coconut sap. He was a famous scholar and got the title Ezhuthachan for his commendable achievement as a teacher. Before drinking madhu, he poured a few drops of madhu on the nearby jackfruit tree as an offering for the God Muthappan. He regularly repeated the practice. Several years after the death of the scholar, the natives experienced serious problems and called upon an astrologer for assistance in finding out the cause. The astrologer concluded that as a result of the regular practice of giving madhu to God Muthappan, the God had started residing there. After the death of the scholar, he no longer got madhu and, in a fit of pique, began creating disturbances. The natives erected a Muthappan temple there. The Koroth family then got the right of Koymma [patron] of the temple.

As a result of the formation of a committee and the work done by the members of the committee, the temple has developed as a famous centre of pilgrimage and hundreds of people visited it daily. There is a strong belief that the God will cure all diseases and will bestow prosperity on His devotees. The devotees get Payakutti from the temple, and it continues to develop as a great centre of pilgrimage like the Sree Muthappan temple at Parassinikadavu.

See also
Parassinikkadavu
Muthappan temple
Kunnathoor Padi
Rajarajeshwara Temple
Sree Muthappan Temple Nileshwar
Valluvan Kadavu Sree Muthappan

References

Books
 Muthappa Darshanam by Sethumadhava Varier (Yamalanandanatha) in Malayalam

External links

Sree Parassini Muthappan
Sree Muthappan
Thayyil Sree Muthappan Madappura,Pinarayi
Sree Muthappan Muktheswaran
Sree Muthappan Seva Sangham & Temple (Coimbatore)
Valluvan Kadavu Sree Muthappan
Photos of Valluvan Kadavu Sree Muthappan
Valluvan Kadavu Sree Muthappan Theyyam

Regional Hindu gods